Pentastemona is a genus in the family Stemonaceae, described as a genus in 1982. In 1992, Duyfjes placed the genus in its own family, the Pentastemonaceae, but this is not widely accepted.

The entire genus is endemic to the Island of Sumatra in Indonesia.

 Species
 Pentastemona egregia (Schott) Steenis
 Pentastemona sumatrana Steenis

References

Pandanales genera
Endemic flora of Sumatra
Stemonaceae